Jaggesh is an Indian politician, actor, director and producer, who mainly works in the Kannada film industry. He is a Member of Parliament in the Rajya Sabha from Karnataka since 2022 and the spokesperson of the Bharatiya Janata Party in Karnataka.

He debuted in Ibbani Karagithu (1983) before appearing in Banda Nanna Ganda, Tharle Nan Maga, Super Nan Maga, Server Somanna, Bevu Bella, Mata, Eddelu Manjunatha, Vaastu Prakaara and Neer Dose.You can also note that he used to remake most of Malayalam actor Dileep's movies into Kannada language e.g.: CID Eesha, Manmatha, Software Ganda, Bodyguard, etc.

Early life

Jaggesh married Parimala, with whom he has sons Gururaj and Yathiraj. Parimala's brother Sunder Ramu is also an actor.

Career

Politics 
Jaggesh is originally from Mayasandra (Jadeya Mayasandra) of Turuvekere Taluk in Tumkur district. His political affiliation was with the Congress party. He ran in the Turuvekere constituency, and won with a healthy margin but resigned from the Legislative Assembly to join the Bharatiya Janata Party. He served as Member of Legislative Council and held the cabinet rank as the vice-chairman of the Karnataka State Road Transport Corporation (K.S.R.T.C.).

Filmography

All the films are in Kannada

Director

Television

References

External links

 Official website (archived)
 

1963 births
Living people
20th-century Indian male actors
21st-century Indian male actors
Film directors from Bangalore
Indian actor-politicians
Indian game show hosts
Indian male comedians
Indian male film actors
Indian National Congress politicians
Kannada film directors
Karnataka MLAs 2008–2013
Male actors from Bangalore
Male actors in Kannada cinema
People from Tumkur
Rajya Sabha members from Karnataka